The 2014 season was the Negeri Sembilan's 91st season in club history and 3rd season in Malaysia Premier League since it was first introduced in 2004. Also it was the first season in the Malaysia Premier League after relegated from Malaysia Super League in 2013 season.

Review

Pre-season
Negeri Sembilan do a massive reshuffle after the club knocked out from 2014 Malaysia Super League. The first step that has been taken by PBNS is to induct V. Sundramoorthy as a Head Coach.

Club

Coaching Staff

Kit Manufacturers & Financial Sponsor

Players

Full Squad

Transfers

Disember
In

Out

April

In

Out

Non-competitive

Pre-season

Friendly

Competitions

Malaysia Premier League

League table

Matches

Malaysia FA Cup

Knockout stage

Malaysia Cup

Play-off

Season Statistics

Top Scorers

Disciplinary Record 

'' = Number of bookings;    = Number of sending offs after a second yellow card;    = Number of sending offs by a direct red card.

References 

Negeri Sembilan FA seasons
Negeri Sembilan